Steven Anthony Lawrence (born July 19, 1990) is an American actor. He is best known for his recurring role as Bernard "Beans" Aranguren in the hit Disney Channel Original Series   Even Stevens from 2001 to 2003. and for his movie roles in The Even Stevens Movie (2003), and Cheaper by the Dozen (2003).

Career

Besides his role in Even Stevens, his other television credits include That's So Raven, Married... with Children, ER, Frasier, and The Amanda Show,  among others.He has also appeared in the feature films Cheaper by the Dozen, Kicking & Screaming, Reboundand Jay and Silent Bob Strike Back (in a deleted scene). He also appeared in the music video "Father of Mine" by Everclear as the little boy whose father walks out on his family. He has  appeared in 2011 as a pink elf in the T-Mobile holiday commercial and in 2012 in a dog costume for an Old Spice commercial.

In 2013, Lawrence gained media attention on Twitter as one of his portraits served as the avatar for the account of American rapper Tyler, the Creator.

Filmography

References

External links
 
 

1990 births
American male child actors
American male film actors
American male television actors
Living people
Male actors from Fresno, California
20th-century American male actors
21st-century American male actors